Barnum Was Right is a 1929 American comedy film directed by Del Lord and starring Glenn Tryon, Merna Kennedy and Basil Radford. Along with the sound version, the film was also released in a silent version for theatres not wired for sound. At present only the silent version exists, whilst the sound version is presumed lost.

Cast
 Glenn Tryon as Freddie Farrell 
 Merna Kennedy as Miriam Locke 
 Otis Harlan as Samuel Locke 
 Basil Radford as Standish 
 Clarence Burton as Martin 
 Lew Kelly as Harrison 
 Isabelle Keith as Phoebe O'Dare 
 Gertrude Sutton as Sarah 
 Louise Beavers as Maid

References

Bibliography
 Munden, Kenneth White. The American Film Institute Catalog of Motion Pictures Produced in the United States, Part 1. University of California Press, 1997.

External links

1929 films
1929 comedy films
Silent American comedy films
Films directed by Del Lord
American silent feature films
1920s English-language films
Universal Pictures films
American black-and-white films
1920s American films